Vitali Yevstigneyev (born 8 August 1985) is a Kazakh football player, who plays for FC Taraz in the Kazakhstan Premier League.

Career statistics

International

Statistics accurate as of match played 11 October 2011

International goals

References

External links
 
 
 Player's profile on the club website

1985 births
Living people
Kazakhstani footballers
Kazakhstan international footballers
Kazakhstan Premier League players
FC Aktobe players
FC Ordabasy players
FC Taraz players
Association football midfielders